Víctor Andrés Catena (1925 – 2 May 2009) was a Spanish screenwriter and film, television and theater director.

Originally titled as Ray el Magnífico, he wrote the story of A Fistful of Dollars (1964), and I pirati della Malesia (1964), both along Jaime Comas. He directed El último tranvía, starring Lina Morgan.

He debuted as a theater writer with Crónica de un cobarde, released in 1966 and was directed by him. He also directed Sé infiel y no mires con quién, starring Pedro Osinaga; and Don Juan o el amor a la geometría.

He was the director of the Aula de Cultura de la Universidad de Granada, and there it was premiered Romeo and Juliet. He influenced Rafael Pérez Estrada.

He died on 2 May 2009 at the age of 84.

Filmography

Writer

Director

References

Bibliography

External links
 
 Plays by Víctor Andrés Catena

1925 births
2009 deaths
Spanish male screenwriters
Spanish film directors
Spanish television directors
Spanish theatre directors
20th-century screenwriters